Calochortus nitidus, the broadfruit mariposa lily, is a North American species of flowering plants in the lily family native to the northwestern United States.

Calochortus nitidus is found primarily in northern Idaho and southeastern Washington, but isolated populations have been reported from Jackson County in southwestern Oregon.

Description
Calochortus nitidus is a perennial herb producing an unbranched stem up to about 40 centimeters tall. flowers are lavender with darker purple markings.

References

External links

Summit Post, Broadfruit Mariposa (Calochortus nitidus) 
Calphotos Photos Gallery, University of California @ Berkeley
Tom Nelson, Calochortus nitidus (broad-fruit mariposa) Wapshilla Ridge Hells Canyon, Idaho. 7/28/11

nitidus
Flora of the Northwestern United States
Plants described in 1849
Flora without expected TNC conservation status